Juan José Sartori Piñeyro (born 6 February 1981) is a Uruguayan businessman, senator and co-owner of Sunderland Football Club. He is the president and founder of Union Group, a privately owned investment firm that holds significant interests across an array of industries worldwide, such as agriculture, technology, energy and real estate.

Early life 
At the age of 12, Sartori moved from Uruguay to France when his mother started working at the United Nations. He went on to study in Switzerland, where he obtained his bachelor's degree in Economics and Business from the University of Lausanne in 2002.

Career

Union Group
Sartori's business career began in Switzerland in 2003 when having just graduated from university he founded Union Capital Group, which evolved into a multi-billion-dollar assets under management investment firm. Expanding into private equity, Sartori set up Union Group in Uruguay in 2007 with a blueberry farming business, subsequently branching out into other sectors such as infrastructure, energy and technology. Since its incorporation, Union Group and its subsidiaries have performed numerous transactions across the world, growing its portfolio of private and public companies.

In 2013, Union Group's agricultural arm, one of the biggest agricultural organizations in Uruguay, floated on the Montevideo Stock Exchange. In June 2014, it accounted for approximately 70 percent of its market capitalisation, making it the largest company listed on the exchange.

In 2010, Sartori began investing in energy generation projects. In 2013, Union Group acquired hydropower company Generacion Andina from German utility firm EnBW. In 2018, Polaris Infrastructure Inc. (TSX: PIF), a Canadian business, purchased Union Group's energy division.

Sartori is the co-founder and chairman of NYSE listed Union Acquisition Corp (UAC), a SPAC or blank check company, which has taken a number of organizations public over recent years, such as crop technology firm [[Bioceres]] Crop Solutions (Nasdaq: BIOX) in 2018, and global healthcare business, Procaps Group (Nasdaq: PROC) in 2021.

Politics 
In December 2018, Sartori presented his nomination to the President of Uruguay for the 2019 primary elections, running as a Partido Nacional candidate. The election was held on 30 June 2019. Sartori carried out a noteworthy campaign, labelled a "political phenomenon" by the Associated Press. He collected 20.68% of the vote, which saw him finish second of six behind current president Luis Lacalle Pou. The Atlante Films documentary "Juan Sartori: behind the phenomenon" follows Sartori on the campaign trail. 

Sartori ran for the Senate in the October 2019 general election and was elected senator, making him the youngest person to currently hold this title, taking up the position on 15 February 2020. He sits on the Senate Committees of International Affairs, Environment, Development and Inclusion, and is president of the Industry Committee. Additionally, he forms part of the Partido Nacional's governing body.

Football
Sartori is a passionate football fan. He is a co-owner of Sunderland AFC. "Sunderland is a huge club, the seventh largest in England, a club with a lot of history and a big following, and that’s what made it attractive", he said following the 2018 acquisition. He sits on the board as a non-executive director. In 2022, the club, based in the North East of England, won the League One playoffs and will play the following season in the EFL Championship, the second most important division in English football. He is also a board member and vice president of AS Monaco Football Club.

Personal life 
Sartori married Russian heiress and equestrian Ekaterina Rybolovleva, on 21 October 2015, on the Greek island of Skorpios, which she bought from Athina Onassis in 2013.

References

External links
 
 Union Capital Group

1981 births
Living people
People from Montevideo
Uruguayan people of Italian descent
Uruguayan businesspeople
University of Lausanne alumni
Uruguayan emigrants to France
Uruguayan emigrants to Switzerland
National Party (Uruguay) politicians
Candidates for President of Uruguay